Guamote Canton is a canton of Ecuador, located in the Chimborazo Province.  Its capital is the town of Guamote.  Its population at the 2001 census was 35,210.

References

Cantons of Chimborazo Province